Joachim-Mähl-Straße is a metro station in Niendorf, Hamburg on the Hamburg U-Bahn line U2.

History
In 1984, construction began to extend the Hagenbecks Tierpark-Niendorf Markt section of the U2, which opened on 1 June 1985, further to Niendorf Nord. This last section of the U2 was supposed to open in 1987,  but complaints from area residents and problems with a high groundwater level made construction four years longer than it was supposed to last.

On 9 March 1991 the extension, and with it Joachim-Mähl Straße station, was officially opened by the First Mayor of Hamburg, Henning Voscherau, with senators Wilhelm Rahlfs and Eugen Wagner in attendance.

Services
Joachim-Mähl-Straße is served by Hamburg U-Bahn line U2.

References 

Hamburg U-Bahn stations in Hamburg
Buildings and structures in Eimsbüttel
U2 (Hamburg U-Bahn) stations
Railway stations in Germany opened in 1991